Denni Robin Avdić (born Deni Avdić; 5 September 1988) is a Swedish professional footballer who plays as a centre-forward for Vasalunds IF.

Beginning his professional career with IF Elfsborg, he has gone on to play professionally in Germany for Werder Bremen and in the Netherlands for PEC Zwolle, AZ Alkmaar, and Heracles Almelo before returning to Sweden in 2016. He has won one cap for the Sweden national team.

Club career

Early career 
Avdić was born in Huskvarna, Sweden. He was 15 years old he was signed by Danish Superliga club Brøndby IF. He played for Brøndby's reserve team in the Danish 2nd Division East – the third tier of Danish football – but did not play any senior games for the club. In 2006, Avdić was released by Brøndby, as he wanted to live closer to his family in Sweden.

IF Elfsborg 
He was picked up by IF Elfsborg in the Swedish Allsvenskan championship. When he was signed by Elfsborg, he was praised by Elfsborg officials as one of the greatest talents in Swedish football.

Avdić made his debut for Elfsborg in November 2006. He played from the start in Elfsborg's first ever Royal League match, and scored two goals in the 4–0 win over AIK. In the 2010 season of the Allsvenskan, Avdić changed position from attacking-midfielder to striker, his previous position as a youth player. He scored 19 goals, making him runner-up golden boot that season, after Alexander Gerndt who scored 20 goals. Due to this he was sold the same season for a transfer fee of £2 million to Werder Bremen.

Werder Bremen 
On 3 January 2011, Avdić became Werder Bremen's first new signing of the winter, as confirmed by the website of the German Bundesliga club. He signed a contract until summer 2014. He featured only on rare occasions for the team during the 2011–12 Bundesliga season. due to his repeating injuries. Before his loan to PEC Zwolle, Avdić played seven games in Bundesliga and 12 games for Werder's second team without scoring a single goal.

Loan to PEC Zwolle 
On 29 August 2012, Avdić agreed to a loan to the Dutch football team PEC Zwolle in Eredivisie until the end of season 2013. And he scored his first goal for the club in his fourth game as a substitute. On 17 February 2013, in his 14th game against Feyenoord, Avdić made the match-winning 3–2 goal for Zwolle, which also meant his seventh goal at the time. This made him at the time the second best Swedish goalscorer in the 2012–13 season, only beaten by Zlatan Ibrahimović. Where experts claimed that he deserved a place in the Swedish national football team, due to Sweden's weak availability of good strikers.

AZ Alkmaar 
In summer 2013, Avdić joined AZ Alkmaar. He made his debut on 30 October in a KNVB Cup match against Achilles '29, scoring two goals. AZ won the match with 7–0.

Loan to Heracles Almelo 
On 15 August 2014, as a result of having no prospect with AZ, he was sent on loan to Heracles Almelo until the end of the season.

Return to Sweden 
He signed with AIK in 2016, and was a part of the AIK team that won the 2018 Allsvenskan.

In February 2019, joined AFC Eskilstuna, newly promoted to Allsvenskan. He left the club at the end of the year. After a long time without a club he signed for Vasalunds IF in March 2021.

In March 2021, Avdić joined Vasalunds IF.

International career 
Avdić scored a total of 19 goals in 57 games for the Sweden U17, U19, and U21 teams, and was a part of the Sweden U21 squad that reached the semi-finals of the 2009 UEFA European Under-21 Championship on home soil.

He made his full international debut for Sweden on 28 January 2009 in a friendly game against Mexico, coming on as a substitute for Daniel Nannskog in the 66th minute.

Career statistics

Honours
IF Elfsborg
 Allsvenskan: 2006
 Svenska Supercupen: 2007

AIK
 Allsvenskan: 2018

Individual
 Allsvenskan top scorer: runner-up 2010

References

External links
 
 
 Voetbal International profile 

1988 births
Living people
People from Huskvarna
Association football wingers
Association football forwards
Swedish people of Bosnia and Herzegovina descent
Swedish footballers
Sweden youth international footballers
Sweden under-21 international footballers
Sweden international footballers
IF Elfsborg players
SV Werder Bremen players
SV Werder Bremen II players
PEC Zwolle players
AZ Alkmaar players
Heracles Almelo players
AIK Fotboll players
AFC Eskilstuna players
Vasalunds IF players
Allsvenskan players
Bundesliga players
3. Liga players
Eredivisie players
Swedish expatriate footballers
Expatriate footballers in Germany
Swedish expatriate sportspeople in Germany
Expatriate footballers in the Netherlands
Swedish expatriate sportspeople in the Netherlands
Sportspeople from Jönköping County